Flaveria angustifolia is a Mexican plant species of yellowtops within the family Asteraceae. It has been found only in central Mexico, in Oaxaca, Guerrero, Puebla, and the Distrito Federal.

One plant can produce numerous flower heads in a dense spiral array. Each head contains 5-7 yellow disc flowers. some heads contain no ray flowers but other heads in the same cluster may have one yellow ray flower.

References

External links 
photo of herbarium specimen collected in Nuevo León in 1990

angustifolia
Endemic flora of Mexico
Plants described in 1795
Taxa named by Christiaan Hendrik Persoon